Fred Kelly (born 17 November 1952) is a Canadian former cross-country skier who competed in the 1972 Winter Olympics.

References

External links
 

1952 births
Living people
Canadian male cross-country skiers
Olympic cross-country skiers of Canada
Cross-country skiers at the 1972 Winter Olympics
First Nations sportspeople